Drive Your Plow Over the Bones of the Dead is a 2009 mystery novel by Olga Tokarczuk. Originally published in Polish by Wydawnictwo Literackie, it was later translated to English by Antonia Lloyd-Jones and published in 2018 by the British independent publisher Fitzcarraldo Editions. The book received a wider release in 2019 when it was published in the United States by Riverhead Books on 13 August 2019. A portion of the English translation was originally published in literary magazine Granta in 2017.

The novel was shortlisted for the 2019 International Booker Prize. Antonia Lloyd-Jones' translation was also longlisted for the 2019 National Book Award for Translated Literature. Tokarczuk was awarded the 2018 Nobel Prize in Literature two months after the novel's US release. In 2020, it was shortlisted for the International Dublin Literary Award.

Plot
Janina Duszejko is an ageing woman who lives in a rural Polish village, located near the Czech border in the Silesia region, in between Lewin and Kłodzko. Janina spends most of her time studying astrology and translating the poetry of William Blake into Polish with her friend Dizzy. She had two dogs as pets but they both went missing. One day, her neighbour Big Foot, a frequent hunter, is found dead in his home by Janina's friend Oddball. From Janina and Oddball's inspection of the scene, it seems Big Foot choked on a bone while eating. Janina also finds a shocking photograph in Big Foot's house, the contents of which are revealed in the penultimate chapter. Janina disliked Big Foot because she disagrees with hunting animals. She begins to believe that animals could have killed Big Foot out of vengeance. She writes to the local police, who ignore her theory. The police commandant–called the Commandant by Janina–is also a hunter and is later found dead beside his car by Dizzy. The Commandant's death emboldens Janina's beliefs, but her friends Dizzy and Oddball are sceptical of her. Janina is questioned by police as a witness to the crime scene. One officer accuses Janina of seemingly valuing the life of animals more than that of humans. Janina tells them that she values both equally.

The village's wealthy fur farmer and brothel owner, Innerd, goes missing. Residents are convinced he ran away with his lover. An entomologist named Borys–spelled "Boros" by Janina–comes to the village. He is researching endangered beetles and hopes to convince the Polish government to protect them from extinction. Janina likes Boros and allows him to move in with her. The two eventually become romantically involved. Innerd is later found dead in the forest, with an animal snare around his leg. Weeks later, the President, leader of a local social club and also a hunter, is found dead, covered in beetles.

A new Catholic chapel is opened in the village and Father Rustle, a local Catholic priest and avid hunter, is its leader. In one of his sermons, Father Rustle praises hunters, calling them "ambassadors and partners of the Lord God in the work of creation." Janina interrupts the sermon, yelling at Rustle and the rest of the villagers. She asks, "Have you fallen asleep? How can you listen to such nonsense without batting an eyelid? Have you lost your minds? Or your hearts? Have you still got hearts?" Days later, the presbytery burns down and Father Rustle is found dead. 

Dizzy and Oddball confront Janina, telling her they know she did it and the circumstances of the President's death gave her away. Janina shows her friends the photograph she found at Big Foot's house, which shows Big Foot, the Commandant, Innerd, the President, and Father Rustle standing near recently killed animals, including her two dogs. Big Foot, she explains, really did choke on a deer bone, but this event, and her discovery of the photograph, inspired her to kill the next four men. 

The next day, police arrive at Janina's house and search it, but she evades capture. Janina flees on foot to the Czech Republic and is then taken by Boros to live in hiding, on the edge of the Białowieża Forest, where she can again be close to nature.

Style
The novel features an unreliable narrator. The protagonist and narrator, Janina, describes the murders that took place without admitting that she herself committed those crimes, until almost the end of the novel. The reader is invited to empathize with the character by sharing her deep concern for the welfare of animals. Her characterization as an eccentric old lady, that is often treated with skepticism or even derision by other characters, further endears her. Her ultimate confession of the murders, therefore, comes as a shock and provides a powerful ending to the novel.

Title
The book draws its title from William Blake's poem "Proverbs of Hell".

Reception
At the review aggregator website Book Marks, which assigns individual ratings to book reviews from mainstream literary critics, the novel received a cumulative "Rave" rating based on 21 reviews: 17 "Rave" reviews, 3 "Positive" reviews, and 1 "Mixed" review.

Kirkus Reviews praised the novel, writing, "Tokarczuk's novel is a riot of quirkiness and eccentricity, and the mood of the book, which shifts from droll humor to melancholy to gentle vulnerability, is unclassifiable—and just right. Tokarczuk's mercurial prose seems capable of just about anything."

Publishers Weekly called the novel "astounding" and wrote that it "succeeds as both a suspenseful murder mystery and a powerful and profound meditation on human existence and how a life fits into the world around it."

Writing for The Guardian, author Sarah Perry favourably reviewed the novel, saying, "It is an astonishing amalgam of thriller, comedy and political treatise, written by a woman who combines an extraordinary intellect with an anarchic sensibility."

Adaptations

Film

The novel was adapted into film in 2017, titled Spoor, directed by Polish director Agnieszka Holland. The film won the Alfred Bauer Prize (Silver Bear) at the 67th Berlin International Film Festival.

Theatre
The novel was adapted into a theatre play by Complicité, touring from December 2022 to June 2023 to: Theatre Royal, Plymouth; Bristol Old Vic; Oxford Playhouse; Barbican Centre, London; Nottingham Playhouse; Belgrade Theatre, Coventry; The Lowry, Salford; Grand Théâtre de Luxembourg; Odéon-Théâtre de l'Europe, Paris.

Audio
Polish actress Beata Poźniak narrated the English translation of Drive Your Plow Over the Bones of the Dead for Penguin Random House released on August 13th 2019. She received an Earphones Award for best audiobook interpretation.

In May 2020, Fitzcarraldo Editions released an audiobook in the UK read by the book's translator, Antonia Lloyd-Jones.

References

Polish novels
2009 novels
21st-century Polish novels
Novels by Olga Tokarczuk
Wydawnictwo Literackie books
Novels set in Poland
Polish novels adapted into films
Novels set in the Czech Republic
Fiction with unreliable narrators
First-person narrative novels
Works about William Blake
2009 in Poland
Fiction about animal cruelty